Jean Augustin Daiwaille (6 August 1786 – 11 April 1850) was a Dutch portrait painter and lithographer.

Life
Daiwaille was born in Cologne, Germany and went to Amsterdam, The Netherlands as a young man, where he studied under Adriaan de Lelie. He was director of the Rijksakademie from 1820 to 1826. After that time, he resided at Rotterdam, where he was very successful in painting portraits, and where he died in 1850. There is by him one etching, which is scarce.

He was an early exponent of lithography during the 1820s, overseeing the installation of a lithographic press at the new Koninklijke Academie, and instructing the students on the use of the technique. He established his own lithographic business in 1826, producing reproductions of his own paintings, and collaborating with other artists such as Barend Cornelis Koekkoek to make copies of their work.

His daughter, Elise Thérèse, married one of his pupils, the painter Barend Cornelis Koekkoek. His son, Alexander Joseph Daiwaille, also became a painter.

Gallery

References

Sources
 

1786 births
1850 deaths
19th-century Dutch painters
Dutch male painters
Dutch portrait painters
German emigrants to the Netherlands
Painters from Rotterdam
19th-century Dutch male artists